Wozchod Handels Bank of Zurich was a Swiss bank established in June 1966.  It was involved in Russian gold trading and was reported to be owned by the Soviet government.  Due to trading losses, the bank was liquidated in 1985.  It also gained notoriety as a bank used by the American embezzler Stanley Rifkin when he defrauded Security Pacific National Bank in 1978.

References 

1966 establishments in Switzerland
1985 disestablishments in Switzerland
Banking in Switzerland
Banks based in Zürich